The Melbourne Royal Show is an agricultural show held at Melbourne Showgrounds every September. It is organised by the Royal Agricultural Society of Victoria and has been running since 1848. 
Each year Melbourne Royal Show attracts attendances of up to half a million people.

About 
The traditional purpose is the display of rural industry, including livestock and produce with its associated competitions and awards however the show also features amusement rides and a sideshow alley, as well as the Australian tradition of 'Showbags', carry bags containing samples of products produced by various commercial enterprises.

A prominent feature during showtime are the many rides including a permanent wooden Mad Mouse roller coaster which resided at the grounds until 2001, owned by Wittingslow Amusements. A permanent chairlift also resided onsite until 2005. The site has its own railway station, used during special events located on the Flemington Racecourse line. The Thursday of the show was once observed as the Show Day public holiday in Melbourne; this holiday was abandoned in 1994.

While the Royal Show is the main show in Victoria, many cities and towns in regional Victoria host smaller shows, such as the Royal Geelong Show, Bendigo Show, Ballarat Show, Warragul Show, Whittlesea Show and the Shepparton Show.

History 
The show was founded in 1848. There was no show in 1915 to 1918 and 1940 to 1945 when the showgrounds were requisitioned for military use during WWI and WWII. In 2020 and 2021 the show was cancelled due to social distancing measures and mass gathering restrictions during the COVID-19 pandemic. In 2022, The Royal Melbourne Show was rebranded to Melbourne Royal Show.

Displays

Competitions
The major rural competitions of the Melbourne Royal® show include Alpaca competitions, Beef Cattle Competitions, Beef Carcase Competitions, Dairy cattle Competition, Dog Competitions, Horse Competitions, Poultry Competition, Sheep Competition, Domestic Animal Competitions, Fleece Competitions and Woodchop Competitions.

The major equestrienne competition of Australia is the Garryowen Equestrienne Turnout which is held here. This is a memorial trophy to Mrs Violet Murrell's bravery in attempting to save her horse, Garryowen from a fire. The competition is judged on mount, costume, saddlery, riding ability and general appearances of horsewomen.

There are also Art, Craft and Cookery Competitions.

Pavilions

Located all around the show grounds are a total of sixteen pavilions and arenas. These include:-
The Woolworths Pavilion where visitors can buy produce including wine, cheese, smallgoods, sauces, fresh fruit, vegetables, homemade ice cream, cheese and hand made chocolates. In 2012 the Grand Pavilion also hosted some of the Victorian Government stands.
The Grand Boulevard is a boulevard with selected themed commercial sites scattered along the spine sweeps across the full length of the site.
The Entertainment Dome was a roofed attraction that replaced the "Herald Sun Town Centre" in 2012. An entertainment venue with food stalls, a major stage (designed for major events/shows), and also a smaller stage for music acts. In 2012 it hosted the My Kitchen Rules live show. In 2016, the Entertainment Dome was replaced by the open Town Square, which featured a full performance stage, a high-dive act, seating, shading, food operators and large screens.
The Herald Sun Arena is a 9,000 square metre open air arena where crowds can watch the special events and entertainment.
The Jayco Animal Nursery Discovery has baby animals.
The Farmhouse is an interactive animal space including shearing and milking demonstrations and activities including pat-a-chook, pat-a-pig, grinding grains and digging for veggies.
The Woodchop Pavilion has woodchopping competitions during the day attracting competitors from Australia and around the world.
The Weekly Times Livestock Pavilion. is a huge pavilion where visitors can see animals or watch what's happening on the judging rings.
The Showbag Pavilion. is a large 3,000 square metre Hoecker building. Primary site for Showbag sales.
The Art, Craft & Cookery Pavilion is full of crafts such as knitting, crochet, decorated cakes, clothing, leather goods, cookery, home made jewellery and glass decorations. In 2017 it was changed to the Spotlight Makers Pavilion.  
The Winning Tastes Pavilion is debuted on location at the MasterChef set in 20165. The Pavilion is designed to showcase local produce and food from The Royal Agricultural Society of Victoria's food and drink programs.
The Advance Dog Pavilion: Over the course of the Royal Melbourne Show thousands of dogs are judged to find the best in show.

Educational 

There are a number of other services which is displayed in Melbourne Royal Show this year in 2022. Australian Firefighters Calendar stall displayed calendars for 2022 and 2023 as a part of fundraising initiative for firefighters of Australia. Online Education Service provider - Byju's Future School also displayed a stall in this year's show which attracted parents and children from a diverse background motivating them to take online classes.

Entertainment
Entertainment consists of multiple live performances, activities and displays. Entertainers have included Mickey and Minnie Mouse, Peppa Pig, Dorothy the Dinosaur from the children's group The Wiggles, Play School and Hi-5 concert, Sampson the Monster truck, clowns, caricature artists and many more. In addition to 774 ABC Melbourne radio outside broadcast. There is a nightly fireworks display and live performances. Lights, colours and sound provide a unique atmosphere in the Carnival precinct at night.

Rides

Wave Swinger
Cliff Hanger
Crazy Spinning Coaster
Dodgem Cars
Ferris Wheel
Rockin' Tug
Hard Rock
Techno Jump
Taipan
No Limit
Mad Mouse
Chaos
Pirates Revenge Flume Ride
Roller Ghoster
Breakdance
Free Style
Rock Star
No Limit
Xtreme
Kamikaze
Power Surge
Space Roller
Hangover(replaced the Twin Flip, in 2012)
XXXL
Rebel
Python Loop Coaster
Mega Drop
The Beast(Australia's first KMG XXL)
Fury

The children's rides include:
Grand Carousel
Jump Around
Taxi Jet Car
Circus Swing
Harley Hog Motor Bike Ride
Rockin' Tug
Flash Dance
Shark Inflatable
Tiger Inflatable
Elephant Jet
Miniature Railway
Go Gator Coaster
Circus Circus
F1 Euro Slide
Undersea Mini Wheel
City Bridge Convoy
Samba Balloon Ride
Aladdin Mini Jet
Cup & Saucer Ride
Outback Pony Rides
Outback Rattler
Free Fall
Mini Jet
Train Ride
Ferrari 500 Racers
Magic Swans

References

External links
Melbourne Royal Show website
Live at Night at the Royal Melbourne Show
Photos from the 2006 Royal Melbourne Show (post renovations.)

Melbourne
Organisations based in Melbourne
1848 establishments in Australia
Recurring events established in 1848